Richard Thomas Bell (born October 18, 1960) is a former American football running back who played in the National Football League for the Minnesota Vikings. He went undrafted in the NFL and signed for the Vikings during the 1983 season; he played 14 games, but his only statistical contribution was a 14-yard kickoff return in a 13–2 loss to the Detroit Lions in Week 14.

References

1960 births
Living people
Sportspeople from St. Cloud, Minnesota
American football running backs
Minnesota Vikings players